Surfers Paradise light rail station is located on the corner of Clifford St and Surfers Paradise Boulevard. The station is situated centrally of suburb of Surfers Paradise, the key tourist destination in the city of the Gold Coast. Surfers Paradise light rail station is serviced by the city's G:link light rail system that connects Broadbeach South to Helensvale. The station provides direct access to the Q1 residential tower, the tallest residential high rise in the southern hemisphere. The station also provides excellent exposure to numerous hotels and holiday apartments.

Location 
Below is a map of the local area. The station can be identified by the grey marker.{
  "type": "FeatureCollection",
  "features": [
    {
      "type": "Feature",
      "properties": {},
      "geometry": {
        "type": "Point",
        "coordinates": [
          153.42905998259087,
          -28.006236968948787
        ]
      }
    }
  ]
}

References

External links 

 G:link

G:link stations
Railway stations in Australia opened in 2014
Surfers Paradise, Queensland